Parklands High School is a government co-educational comprehensive secondary school located in , a suburb of , Tasmania, Australia. Established in 1958, the school caters for approximately 400 students from Years 7 to 12. The school is administered by the Tasmanian Department of Education.

In 2019 student enrolments were 373. The school principal is Sue Barnes.

In 1966, the school was relocated from near West Park to a  site in Romaine.

See also 
Education in Tasmania
List of schools in Tasmania

References

External links
Parklands High School website

Public high schools in Tasmania
Educational institutions established in 1958
1958 establishments in Australia
Burnie, Tasmania